Minuscule 333 (in the Gregory-Aland numbering), Nμ230 and Nι230 (Soden), is a Greek minuscule manuscript of the New Testament, on cotton paper. It is dated by a colophon to the year 1214.

Description 

The codex contains the text of the Gospel of Matthew and Gospel of John on 377 paper leaves with a Commentary. The text is written in one column per page, in 40-50 lines per page. The biblical text is surrounded by Nicetas catenae. 

Aland did not place the Greek text of the codex in any Category.

History 

The manuscript once belonged to Arsenius, Archbishop of Monembasia, in the Morea (as Lectionary 113), then to Gabriel, metropolitan of Philadelphia. At the end of the 16th century it came to Italy. It was added to the list of New Testament manuscripts by Scholz (1794-1852).
C. R. Gregory saw it in 1886.

The manuscript is currently housed at the Turin National University Library (B. I. 9) in Turin.

See also 

 List of New Testament minuscules
 Biblical manuscript
 Textual criticism
 Minuscule 332

References

Further reading 

 Giuseppe Passino, Codices Manuscripti Bibliohecae Regii Taurinensis Athenaei, Turin 1742, vol. 2.

External links 

 
 Images of 333 at the INTF

Greek New Testament minuscules
13th-century biblical manuscripts